Eobelinae are an extinct weevil subfamily that throve in the late Mesozoic. They belong to the family Nemonychidae. The Eobelidae were widespread, occurring at least in Central Asia, Spain and Brazil during the Late Jurassic and Early Cretaceous (about ).

Description
Adult Eobelinae are recognizable by their elongated and flat body and long rostrum ("snout"), the latter being longer than the head and pronotum together. Like in other belids, their antennae were straight, not elbowed as in the true weevils (Curculionidae); they insert near the rostrum's center. The "forehead" between the rostrum base and the eyes has a marked outward bulge. The tibiae of the middle and hind legs have spurs at their tips.

Their larvae are unknown. Presumably,  they fed on the wood and fruits of diseased or dying plants or on deadwood, with healthy plants less important as food.

Systematics
Genera:
†Archaeorrhynchus Martynov, 1926 (Late Jurassic of Kazakhstan)
†Belonotaris Arnoldi, 1977 (Late Jurassic of Kazakhstan - Early Cretaceous of Russia)
†Davidibelus Zherikhin & Gratshev, 2004 (Early Cretaceous of Brazil)
†Eobelus Arnoldi, 1977 (Late Jurassic of Kazakhstan)
†Longidorsum Zhang, 1977 (Early Cretaceous of China)
†Microprobelus Ming, Dong & Chungkun, 2006  (Yixian Early Cretaceous of Lingyuan City, China)
†Montsecbelus Zherikhin & Gratshev, 1997 (Early Cretaceous of Spain)
†Probelopsis Arnoldi, 1977 (Late Jurassic of Kazakhstan)
†Probelus Arnoldi, 1977 (Late Jurassic of Karatau Range, Kazakhstan - Yixian Early Cretaceous of Hebei, China)

Footnotes

References

  (2006): Phylogeny of the Oxycoryninae sensu lato (Coleoptera: Belidae) and evolution of host-plant associations. Invertebrate Systematics 20: 447–476.  (HTML abstract)
  (2006): A new fossil weevil (Coleoptera, Curculionoidea, Belidae) from the Yixian Formation of western Liaoning, China. Progress in Natural Science 16 (8): 885–888.  (HTML abstract)

†
Mesozoic arthropods
Prehistoric beetles
†